8-oxo-dGDP phosphatase (NUDT5) is an enzyme with systematic name 8-oxo-dGDP phosphohydrolase. This enzyme catalyses the following chemical reaction

 8-oxo-dGDP + H2O  8-oxo-dGMP + phosphate

The enzyme catalyses the hydrolysis of both 8-oxo-dGDP and 8-oxo-GDP.

References

External links 
 

EC 3.6.1